An air force is armed service that primarily conducts aerial warfare.

Air Force can also refer to:

Arts and entertainment
 Air Force (film), a 1943 war film directed by Howard Hawks
 Airforce (TV series), a 1988 miniseries featuring the Republic of Singapore Air Force
 The Air Force (album), the fifth album of the band Xiu Xiu
"Air Force", a 1978 song by Space
 "Air Forces", a song by Young Jeezy from his 2005 album Let's Get It: Thug Motivation 101
 "Air Force", a 2018 song by DigDat
 Ginger Baker's Air Force, a jazz-rock supergroup in the early 1970s led by Ginger Baker
Air Force (game), a 1976 wargame about WWII aerial combat over Europe

Sports teams
 Air Force Falcons, the intercollegiate sports program of the US Air Force Academy
 Air Force Central F.C., a professional Thai football club based in Rangsit
 Air Force F.C., an Eritrean football club based in Dekemhare
 Air Force FC, a South Korean military sports club that merged with others which later became Sangju Sangmu FC
 Air Force Sports Club, a Sri Lankan football club based in Colombo

Other uses
 Air Force (shoe), a range of athletic shoes made by Nike, Inc.
 Airforce Airguns, an American airgun company

See also

 Al-Quwa Al-Jawiya, an Iraqi football club from Baghdad whose name means Air Force SC in Arabic
 Aerospace Force (disambiguation)